Hymen L. Lipman (March 20, 1817 – November 4, 1893) is credited with registering the first patent for a pencil with an attached eraser on March 30, 1858.

Hymen L. Lipman was born March 20, 1817, in Kingston, Jamaica, to English parents. He immigrated to the United States around 1829 with them, arriving in Philadelphia, Pennsylvania, where he resided for the remainder of his life.

In 1840, Lipman succeeded Samuel M. Stewart, then the leading stationer in Philadelphia. Three years later, he started the first envelope company in the U.S.

In August 7, 1848, he was married to Mary A. Lehman, daughter of Peter Lehman, one of the founders of the Philadelphia College of Pharmacy in Philadelphia. They had a son and two daughters.

In 1862, Lipman sold his lead-pencil and eraser patent for $100,000 to Joseph Reckendorfer, who went to sue the pencil manufacturer Faber for infringement. In 1875, the Supreme Court of the United States ruled against Reckendorfer, declaring the patent invalid because his invention was actually a combination of two already known things with no new use.

An incorrect picture of Hymen Lipman that surfaced on the internet in an April 3, 2012, YouTube post (Mr. Hymen Lipman - The Father of Modern Content Editing - This Day in SEO History - Vol 4 by Fathom) has been subsequently used by many others on the internet. The picture most often used is not of Hymen Lipman but rather Crawford W. Long of Georgia, credited with first using ether for surgical anesthesia on March 30, 1842. Another picture occasionally used as Lipman on the internet is an artist's rendition of a younger Edgar Allan Poe.

References

Pencils
19th-century American inventors
1817 births
1893 deaths